Derek Ernest Blackman is a British psychologist whose research was concerned with the experimental analysis of  learned behaviour.

Career
Blackman obtained his BSc from the University of Exeter in 1966 followed by a PhD from Queen's University of Belfast in 1968. He was appointed to the Department of Psychology in the faculty of Science at the University of  Birmingham before being appointed to the faculty at the University of Cardiff  where he remained  for the whole of his later academic career.  He served as Head of Department and Dean in the Faculty of Science. He retired in 1998 as Emeritus Professor of Psychology.

He was active in the British Psychological Society of which he became president in 1981.  After his retirement he was active in international education including involvement in the International Baccalaureate and in the United World Colleges.

Research
His research was concerned with the experimental analysis of learned behaviour. He authored a large number of journal articles, chapters and books.

Books
Blackman, D.E. (1997). Operant Conditioning: An Experimental Analysis of Behaviour.
 Sanger, D., & Blackman, D.E. (Eds) (2016) Aspects of Psychopharmacology.

Awards
 Fellow, British Psychological Society
 1997: Hon DSc, National University of Distance Education,Spain

Positions

 1981: President, British Psychological Society
 1998-1999: Director General, International Baccalaureate
 2004-2012: Vice-Chair, International Board, United World Colleges

References

1945 births
British psychologists
Presidents of the British Psychological Society
20th-century British psychologists
Living people
Experimental psychologists
Academics of Cardiff University